is Japanese athlete specialising in the long jump. He twice represented his country at World Championships, in 2007 and 2009, failing to reach the final.

His personal bests are 8.09 metres outdoors (2008) and 7.77 metres indoors (2003). He also holds the Japanese masters record (M35) with 7.33 metres outdoors (2017).

Competition record

National titles
Japanese Championships
Long jump: 2007, 2009, 2012

References

External links

Daisuke Arakawa at JAAF 
Daisuke Arakawa at TBS  (archived)

1981 births
Living people
Sportspeople from Hyōgo Prefecture
Japanese male long jumpers
World Athletics Championships athletes for Japan
Japan Championships in Athletics winners
21st-century Japanese people